Fili-Davydkovo District  is an administrative district (raion) of Western Administrative Okrug, and one of the 125 raions of Moscow, Russia.

It is named after the former villages Fili and Davydkovo.

See also
Administrative divisions of Moscow

References

Districts of Moscow